Raisa Padamsee is an Indian actress, who acted in the well-known Indian auteur Mani Kaul's 1973 Hindi film Duvidha.

Early life
Raisa is the only daughter of an Indian-French couple, the well-known painter Akbar Padamsee and Solange Gounelle. She was named by M.F. Hussain, whose daughter is named Raisa, as well.

Career
She played the female protagonist in the critically acclaimed film Duvidha that won best director's national award and Critics Award for Best Film at the 1974 Filmfare Awards. Raisa did not know a word of Hindi and only spoke French, when she played the role of the silent bride in the movie.

Personal life
Raisa did not act in any more movies after her debut movie, and went back to Paris where she now lives with her family. Her husband Laurent Brégeat is a filmmaker.

Well-known theater personality and ad film maker Alyque Padamsee is her paternal uncle. He was married to the singer and actress Sharon Prabhakar. Their daughter and Raisa's cousin Shazahn Padamsee too is an actress.

References

Year of birth missing (living people)
Living people
20th-century Indian actresses
Indian film actresses
Indian people of French descent
Actresses in Hindi cinema
Actresses of European descent in Indian films
Indian expatriates in France
Khoja Ismailism
Gujarati people